Poreč (or) is a town and municipality on the western coast of the Istrian peninsula, in Istria County, west Croatia. Its major landmark is the 6th-century Euphrasian Basilica, which was designated a UNESCO World Heritage Site in 1997.

The town is almost 2,000 years old, and is set around a harbour protected from the sea by the small island of Sveti Nikola/San Nicola (Saint Nicholas). Its population of approximately 12,000 resides mostly on the outskirts, while the wider Poreč area has a population of approximately 16,600 inhabitants. Ever since the 1970s, the coast of Poreč and neighboring Rovinj (Rovigno) has been the most visited tourist destination in Croatia.

History

Prehistory
This area has been inhabited since prehistoric times.

Roman period
During the 2nd century BC, a Roman castrum was built on a tiny peninsula with approximate dimensions of  where the town centre is now. During the reign of Emperor Augustus in the 1st century BC, it officially became a city and was part of the Roman colony of Colonia Iulia Parentium.

In the 3rd century the settlement had an organised Christian community with an early-Christian complex of sacral buildings. The earliest basilica contained the remains of and was dedicated to Saint Maurus of Parentium and dates back to the second half of the 4th century. The floor mosaic from its oratory, originally part of a large Roman house, is still preserved in the garden of the Euphrasian Basilica.

Middle Ages
With the fall of the Western Roman Empire in 476, different rulers and powers governed. First, it was held by the Ostrogoths and after 539 was part of the Byzantine Empire. From 788 it was ruled by the Franks. A short independence period followed in the 12th century and later it was ruled by the Patriarchate of Aquileia. In 1267 Parenzo became the first Istrian city that chose to become part of the Republic of Venice, whose rule lasted for more than five centuries. During this period several palaces, squares and religious buildings in Venetian style were built. In 1354 the city was destroyed by the Genoese. In 1363 the town was given the City Statute.

Modern period
The population was decimated by plague at the end of the 16th and the beginning of the 17th century. After the fall of the Venetian Republic, Parenzo came under the sovereignty of the Habsburg monarchy.

Between 1805 and 1814, Parenzo was part of the Napoleonic Kingdom of Italy and then of the Illyrian Provinces, nominally part of the First French Empire. After this period it was again annexed by the Habsburgs, with the Monarchy reorganized into the Austrian Empire. In 1844 a steamship connection was established between Parenzo and Trieste.

In 1861, under Austrian Littoral Parenzo became the seat of the regional Parliament, with schools, administrative and judiciary offices, and other services. During this time, it slowly became a shipbuilding center. It also became a popular tourist resort for the Austro-Hungarian aristocracy. Between 1902 and 1935 the Parenzana (from the name 'Parenzaner Bahn'), a narrow-gauge railway line connected the town to Trieste.

After 1918, it became part of the Kingdom of Italy. In 1944, the city was bombed by the Allies 34 times, damaging 75% of the city.

Yugoslav period (1945/47-1991)
In 1947, two years after World War II, it was occupied by Yugoslavia and the city name was changed into Poreč. The Italian population left the city and was replaced by Slavic people from different regions of Yugoslavia. 

From 1945 to 1991, Poreč was a city of Croatia, then part of the Socialist Federal Republic of Yugoslavia.

Independent Croatia (since 1991)
In 1991 Croatia became an independent state. Today, the city's Italian name is also used in an official capacity.

Climate

Situated on the western coast of Istria and cooled by sea breezes, the local climate is relatively mild and free of oppressive summer heat. There are more than 2,400 hours of sun a year, an average of more than 10 hours of sunshine during the summer days. Sea temperatures can reach , higher than one might expect compared to the coast of southern Croatia where the air temperatures are higher. Winds here are the Bora, bringing the cold, clear weather from the north in the winter, and the Jugo, a warm southern wind bringing rain. The summer breeze that blows from the sea to the land is called the Maestral.

Nearby sightseeing sites

The Baredine Cave, the only open geological monument in Istria, is in the vicinity. Stalagmites in the cave are known for their curious shapes. One is said to resemble the Virgin Mary, another the Leaning Tower of Pisa.

Lim Bay is a 12-km long estuary with the aspect of a narrow canal, created by the river Pazinčica by eroding the ground on its way to the Adriatic Sea. Quartz boulders are occasionally found here, exposed by the sea.

Vegetation and agriculture
The landscape is rich in Mediterranean vegetation, with pine woods and green bushes, mostly of the holm oak and strawberry tree. For generations, the fertile blood-red land has been used for agriculture, with cereals, orchards, olive groves and vegetables the main crops. Today the production of organic food is significant, including olives, grapes, and popular wines such as Malvazija, Borgonja, Merlot, Pinot, Cabernet Sauvignon and Teran.

Transportation 

Road traffic is the primary form of transportation. Poreč is well-connected with the rest of Istria and with larger cities such as Trieste, Rijeka (Fiume), Ljubljana and Zagreb. The nearest commercial airport is in Pula (Pola). Sea traffic is less important today than it was in previous centuries; these days it is primarily used for tourist excursions. The closest railway station is in Pazin (Pisino), which is the seat of the Istria County local authority. Between 1902 and 1937 the Parenzana, a narrow-gauge railway line connected the town to Trieste.

Economy 

Traditionally, economic activities have always been connected with the land and sea. The only significant industry in the area is food processing, but Croatia's ongoing integration into the broader European economy has led to Poreč seeing growth in its trade, finance and communication sectors. However, the primary source of income is tourism.

Real estate prices are very high due to the city's prime location.

Demographics

According to the 2011 census, the main ethnic groups in Poreč are Croats (74.8%), Italians (3.2%), Serbs (3.4%), Albanians (2.7%) and Bosniaks (1.95%).
Also part of the Parentian people submitted the choice "regional" (as Istrian), regardless of their Italian or Croatian origin. In the common use Italian is spoken by 15% of the local population.

According to the 2011 census, there are 9,790 residents of the town of Poreč, and with all settlements included, municipality of Poreč has a total of 16,696 residents:

 Antonci, population 164
 Baderna, population 240
 Banki, population 17
 Bašarinka, population 90
 Blagdanići, population 15
 Bonaci, population 104
 Bratovići, population 19
 Brčići, population 163
 Buići, population 131
 Cancini, population 158
 Červar-Porat, population 527
 Črvar, population 99
 Čuši, population 20
 Dekovići, population 45
 Dračevac, population 166
 Filipini, population 43
 Fuškulin, population 181
 Garbina, population 68
 Jakići Gorinji, population 18
 Jasenovica, population 50
 Jehnići, population 39
 Jurići, population 3
 Kadumi, population 216
 Katun, population 64
 Kirmenjak, population 48
 Kosinožići, population 99
 Kukci, population 500
 Ladrovići, population 86
 Matulini, population 16
 Mičetići, population 37
 Mihatovići, population 122
 Mihelići, population 43
 Montižana, population 57
 Mugeba, population 180
 Mušalež, population 366
 Nova Vas, population 480
 Poreč - Parenzo, population 9,790
 Radmani, population 241
 Radoši kod Žbandaja, population 115
 Rakovci, population 26
 Rupeni, population 2
 Ružići, population 19
 Stancija Vodopija, population 116
 Starići, population 8
 Stranići kod Nove Vasi, population 177
 Šeraje, population 2
 Štifanići, population 61
 Šušnjići, population 29
 Valkarin, population 44
 Veleniki, population 107
 Vrvari, population 792
 Vržnaveri, population 76
 Žbandaj, population 417

Main sights

The town plan still shows the ancient Roman Castrum structure. The main streets are Decumanus and Cardo Maximus, still preserved in their original forms. Marafor is a Roman square with two temples attached.
A few houses from the Romanesque period have been preserved and beautiful Venetian Gothic palaces can be seen here. Originally a Gothic Franciscan church built in the 13th century, the 'Dieta Istriana' hall was remodeled in the Baroque style in the 18th century.

The Euphrasian Basilica, rebuilt in the 6th century under the Byzantine Empire and bishop Euphrasius, is the most important historical site in Parenzo. It is a protected World Heritage Site, so designated by UNESCO in 1997.
Between the 12th and 19th centuries, the city had defensive walls, as the better-known Dubrovnik still does today.

Porec also has one of the smallest streets in Europe the Ulica Stjepana Konzula Istranina.

Tourism

In 1844, the Austrian Lloyd steamship company opened a tourist line which called at Parenzo. The first tourist guide describing and depicting the town was printed as early as 1845. The oldest hotel is the Riviera, constructed in 1910. Later came the Parentino and others.

The south hosts self-contained centres like Plava Laguna ("Blue Lagoon"), Zelena Laguna ("Green Lagoon"), Bijela Uvala ("White Cove") and Brulo. To the north, mirroring centres are Materada, Červar Porat, Ulika and Lanterna. In the high season, the area's temporary population can exceed 120,000.

Poreč's heritage can be seen in the historic town centre, in museums and galleries hosted in houses and palaces, many of them still private homes as they have been for centuries. In the off season, weekend visitors from Croatia, Slovenia, Austria and Italy visit the area. Sports complexes are developed and used year-round.

Notable natives
Chronologically:
 Giuseppe Picciola, Italian poet (1859–1907)
 Giuseppe Pagano, Italian architect (1896–1945)
 Mario Visintini (1913–1941), Italian flying ace of the Spanish Civil War and World War II
 Licio Visintini (1915–1942), brother of Mario, Italian naval officer during World War II, member of an elite commando frogman unit
 Rita Rusić (1960), Italian actress, singer and producer
 Simon Sluga (1993), Croatian footballer

Twin town and sister cities 
 Massa Lombarda, Italy
 Siófok, Hungary
 Poing, Germany

See also 

 Roman Catholic Diocese of Poreč-Pula

References

External links 

 Poreč – Croatian National Tourist Board Website
 Poreč-Parenzo Tourist Office Official Website
 Poreč – Istria Tourist Board Website
 Istra Music Festival - International Music Festival in Poreč
 Poreč on the Map – Poreč locations on the map with extended info and historical facts
 (Map of Parenzo region).

 
Cities and towns in Croatia
Populated coastal places in Croatia
Populated places in Istria County
World Heritage Sites in Croatia
Italian-speaking territorial units in Croatia